The Little Devil River is a river of the Tasman Region of New Zealand's South Island. It flows southeast to reach the Devil River 15 kilometres southwest of Tākaka.

See also
List of rivers of New Zealand

References

Rivers of the Tasman District
Rivers of New Zealand